Papirnica is a settlement in the Municipality of Škofja Loka in the Upper Carniola region of Slovenia.

Name
The name Papirnica literally means 'paper factory'. In the 18th century paper was manufactured at the Pirman farm in the village.

References

External links

Papirnica at Geopedia

Populated places in the Municipality of Škofja Loka